Vladimir Matveevich Gessen (– 14 January 1920) was a Russian jurist and politician. He was the country's first theoretician of constitutional law and was instrumental for the spread of the idea of constitutional, representative government in Russia.

Career 
Gessen taught constitutional and administrative law at the St. Petersburg Polytechnic Institute, edited the liberal journals Pravo and Vestnik Prava and served as a Constitutional Democrat representative to the Duma.

A proponent of natural law, Gessen's scholarly work was strongly influenced by German constitutional theory. He advocated the establishment of a representative democracy with checks and balances governed by the rule of law, and assigned particular importance to the guarantees of personal freedom and private property during the transition phase.

References
 

1868 births
1920 deaths
People from Odesa
People from Odessky Uyezd
Russian Constitutional Democratic Party members
Members of the 2nd State Duma of the Russian Empire
Russian legal scholars